FabricLive.40 is a 2008 mix album by Noisia. The album was released as part of the FabricLive Mix Series.

Track listing
  Noisia & Phace - Cannonball - Vision Recordings
  The Qemists - Stompbox (Spor Remix) - Ninja Tune
  Phace - Alive (Dub) - Phace
  The Upbeats - Anti Social - Cyanide Recordings
  Break - Splash Step - Quarantine
  Noisia - Diplodocus (Dub) - Noisia
  Spor - Claret's March - Lifted		
  Noisia - Head Knot (Dub) - Noisia
  Noisia - The Tide - Vision Recordings
  Icicle - Nowhere (Dub) - Icicle
  Noisia & Phace - The Feed - Subtitles
  Sabre - Global (Dub) - Subtitles
  Phace - Cold Champagne (Dub) - Phace
  The Upbeats - Panic - Subtitles
  Noisia & Black Sun Empire - Infusion - Vision Recordings
  Noisia - Split The Atom (Instrumental) - Division Recordings
  Spor - Mordez Moi - Division Recordings
  Noisia - Seven Stitches - Division Recordings
  Noisia - Brown Time - Division Recordings
  Noisia - Stigma (Dub) - Noisia
  Moby - Alice (Noisia Remix) - EMI
  Noisia - Concussion - Vision Recordings
  Noisia - Façade (VIP) - Ram Records
  Ed Rush & Optical - Medicine (Matrix Remix) - Virus
  Noisia & The Upbeats - Mudslide - Vision Recordings
  Misanthrop - Viperfish (VIP) - Subtitles
  Noisia - Crank (Dub) - Noisia
  Noisia & The Upbeats - Creep Out - Non Vogue
  Noisia - Square Feet - Division Recordings

External links
Fabric: FabricLive.40

Fabric (club) albums
Noisia albums
2008 compilation albums